Calophyllum austroindicum is a species of plant belonging to the genus Calophyllum of the family Calophyllaceae, commonly called the Cheru pinnai or kattupunna. This plant grows in the wet forests of the Western Ghats in India and is also found in Andaman & Nicobar Islands.

Gallery

References 

austroindicum